Eino Virtanen (born 1 January 1914, date of death unknown) was a Finnish footballer. He played in three matches for the Finland national football team from 1936 to 1941. He was also part of Finland's squad for the football tournament at the 1936 Summer Olympics, but he did not play in any matches. He played mostly for Helsingin Jalkapalloklubi. In 1932 he played for Helsingin Kullervo in Finnish Workers' Sports Federation competition. For HJK he played 182 games and scored 5 goals in Mestaruussarja. He also played one season in Suomensarja and scored once.

Honours

As a player 
Helsingin Jalkapalloklubi
 Mestaruussarja: 1936, 1938

References

External links
 

1914 births
Year of death missing
Helsingin Jalkapalloklubi players
Finnish footballers
Finland international footballers
Place of birth missing
Association football defenders